Narrabri is a locality and seat of Narrabri Shire local government area in the North West Slopes, New South Wales, Australia on the Namoi River,  northwest of Sydney. It sits on the junction of the Kamilaroi Highway and the Newell Highway. At the 2016 census, the town of Narrabri had a population of 5,903.

Because of the geography of Narrabri and the surrounding areas, Narrabri township was quite prone to flooding and fire. Recently, changes have been made to the river flow to improve overall safety.

It is the centre of a major cotton-growing industry. Other agricultural industries in the area include wheat, beef and lamb.  Nearby attractions are Mount Kaputar National Park, the Australia Telescope Compact Array at the Paul Wild Observatory (administered by the CSIRO) and a number of agricultural centres. Just to the south of town is the Pilliga Forest, the largest remnant temperate forest in Eastern Australia. Narrabri also has The Crossing Theatre, a 1,000-seat auditorium and cinema complex.

History
Before the arrival of the Europeans in the early 19th century, Narrabri was the home of the Gamilaroi people, who still constitute a significant part of the local population. Narrabri derives its name from an early property in the district called the Narrabry Run. The name Narrabri is aboriginal in origin and has several possible meanings which include 'snake place', 'big creek' or 'Forked Sticks'.

In 1860, Narrabri was proclaimed a town and a year later, on 1 June 1861, Narrabri Post Office opened. Other buildings followed, with the hospital and the first courthouse (1864–65), the school (1868), the police station (1878–79) and post office (1879). During the 1880s the gaol and the second courthouse were built.

Heritage listings
Narrabri has a number of heritage-listed sites, including:
 Bowen Street: Narrabri Gaol and Residence
 138-140 Maitland Street: Narrabri Post Office

Population
According to the 2016 census of Population, there were  13,084 people in Narrabri.
 Aboriginal and Torres Strait Islander people made up 12.2% of the population. 
 82.3% of people were born in Australia and 87.4% of people spoke only English at home. 
 The most common responses for religion were Anglican 32.2%, Catholic 23.4% and No Religion 18.1%.

Climate

Narrabri West Post Office (1962–2002)

Narrabri Airport AWS (2001–2020)

Over the years, Narrabri has had a number of weather stations run by the Bureau of Meteorology or other government agencies. Narrabri West Post Office made rainfall observations from the late 1800s. From June 1960 until August 2002, it observed and reported other weather elements such as temperature and wind speed. Since then it only reports rainfall. The current weather station for Narrabri is Narrabri Airport Automatic Weather Station (AWS), which began observations in 2001.

Significant weather events

On 4 January 1902 a severe thunderstorm, with large hail and destructive winds, struck the town, with many buildings either damaged or destroyed. The storm, which lasted only five minutes, was described as a 'cyclone'. One man died after being struck by lightning and another two people were injured by the storm. Damage caused by the storm was estimated to be around £3,000.

Media
Narrabri has a twice-weekly published newspaper, The Courier, one of the few remaining independent regional newspapers in Australia.

A local volunteer-run community radio station, 2MAX FM services the area, broadcasting on 91.3 MHz FM, from the nearby Mt Dowe, and is able to cover a very large area due to this altitude. The station started in 2006. 2MAX FM has a focus on country music and older listeners.

Transport
Regional airline Link Airways operates scheduled flights to and from Brisbane and Sydney on Tuesdays and Thursdays. The town is also served by charter flights. It is almost equidistant from Brisbane and Sydney.

Railway station
Narrabri railway station is on the Mungindi line,  from Sydney. The station opened in 1897 and is served by a single daily Xplorer diesel railmotor between Sydney and Moree.

Narrabri is an important centre for rail freight, with considerable infrastructure improvements since the mid-1990s.

Sports Teams
The most popular sport in Narrabri by a considerable margin is Rugby league. The local team, the Narrabri Blues, were founded in 1921 and play at Collins Park. They currently compete in the Group 4 Rugby League competition, in which they have won five premierships, the last of which came in 1990.

Other sports teams include the Narrabri Eagles AFC and Narrabri Blue Boars RUFC.

Coal seam gas proposal 
A coal seam gas field has been proposed for the Narrabri area. It will extend west to Yarrie Lake, which will be surrounded by 450 gas well pads with 850 gas wells over the next 20 years if the project goes ahead.  The project has been opposed by a coalition of rural residents and urban environmentalists.

Popular culture 
Narrabri is referenced in the song Tucker's Daughter, by Australian rock singer Ian Moss, where the action takes place on a cotton farm on the plains of Narrabri.

Notable residents
 Jeff Hardy, Australian Paralympic swimmer
 Chris Latham, former Australian Wallaby rugby union player
 Sam Naismith, Australian rules footballer
 Ernest Riddle, former Governor of the Commonwealth Bank of Australia
 Jason Stoltenberg, former international tennis player. World #1 junior player in 1987
 Jamie Lyon, former National Rugby League player for the Manly Sea Eagles and New South Wales Origin.
 Darrell Trindall, rugby league footballer of the 1990s
 Andrew Curry, Former Australian Olympic javelin athlete and the nation's leading javelin specialist in the 1990s. locals know him as Narrabri's most treasured local sports star

References

External links

Narrabri Shire Council
Narrabri Region Tourism
VisitNSW.com – Narrabi
Narrabri Gas Project
Narrabri.net

 
Towns in New South Wales
North West Slopes
Newell Highway